Vattakera was a first century CE Digambara Jain Acharya who wrote Mulachara around 150 CE.

Notes

References
 

Indian Jain monks 
1st-century Indian Jains 
1st-century Jain monks 
1st-century Indian monks